Clitocybe catinus, or Infundibulicybe catinus, is a mushroom belonging to the genus Clitocybe.

It differs from C. gibba by its cap having some pink tonality and its slight smell of flower.

Chemistry
It contains acetylenic compounds.

References

catinus